Dirichlet is a lunar impact crater that is located on the Moon's far side. It is attached to the southern outer rim of the crater Henyey. To the south-southeast is the much larger crater Tsander.

This is a circular crater with a sharp-edged rim that is not significantly worn. There are slight outward protrusions along the eastern side. The sides of the inner walls have slumped down to form a ring of scree along the base.

Dirichlet lies on the eastern margin of the Dirichlet-Jackson Basin.

Satellite craters
By convention these features are identified on lunar maps by placing the letter on the side of the crater midpoint that is closest to Dirichlet.

References

 
 
 
 
 
 
 
 
 
 
 
 

Impact craters on the Moon